The Doktoringenieur (acronym Dr.-Ing., also Doktor der Ingenieurwissenschaften) is the German  engineering doctorate degree, comparable to the Doctor of Engineering, Engineering Doctorate, Doctor of Science (Engineering), Doctor of Science (Technology) or a PhD in Engineering or Architecture.

It was first introduced in 1899, in the context of the centenary of the Technical University of Berlin, at the Prussian Institutes of Technology. The other German states adopted it in the following years. In contrast to the other historic doctoral degrees (e.g. Dr. phil., Dr. iur. or Dr. med.), the Doktoringenieur was not titled in Latin but German, and therefore written with dash (Dr.-Ing.).

In the field of mathematics, computer science and natural sciences, some universities offer the choice between Dr.-Ing. and Dr. rer. nat. based on the primary focus of the dissertation. If the contributions focus slightly more on applied scientific engineering a Dr.-Ing. is given, while a Dr. rer. nat. is preferred if the dissertation contains more theoretical scientific contributions. A German doctorate is usually a research doctorate and is awarded in the context of the so-called Promotion that also requires a dissertation.

It should not be confused with a Dutch double title dr. ing., indicating that one holds both a research doctorate (dr.) from a university and an engineer's degree (ing.) from a Dutch polytechnic (i.e. Hogeschool).

See also 
 Dr. rer. nat.

References 

Doctoral degrees
Engineering education
Architectural education